Palencia Club de Fútbol was a Spanish football club based in Palencia, in the autonomous community of Castile and León. Founded in 1960, it held home games at Estadio La Balastera, with a 13,468-seat capacity.

History
Safe for five seasons in the regional leagues, Palencia spent the first 17 years of its existence in Tercera División. From 1977 to 1979, the club achieved two consecutive promotions, thus reaching Segunda División (second division), where it competed for four of the following five seasons, finishing a best-ever fifth in 1982–83, just three points off the promotion zone.

Palencia Club de Fútbol disappeared in 1986 due to serious economic debts, with the club now in Segunda División B. Another team was founded in the city following its demise, CF Palencia, which came to compete several seasons in that same category.

Season to season

4 seasons in Segunda División
5 seasons in Segunda División B
12 seasons in Tercera División

Selected former players
 Carlos Echarri
 Óscar Ferrero
 Joaquín López
 Hugo Módigo
 Norberto Huezo
 Paco Bonet
 Antonio Teixidó
 Benigno Chaparro

Selected former managers
 Luis Costa
 Francisco Gento
 Miguel Ángel Montes

References

Defunct football clubs in Castile and León
Sport in Palencia
Association football clubs established in 1960
Association football clubs disestablished in 1986
1960 establishments in Spain
1986 disestablishments in Spain
Palencia CF
Segunda División clubs